Kyriakos Nektarios Tohouroglou (Greek: Κυριάκος Τοχούρογλου; alternatively spelt Tochouroglou) is a Greek-Australian  footballer who plays as a goalkeeper.

Biography
Tohouroglou was born on 13 August 1972 in Sydney to parents from Greece. He joined his family when they returned to Greece in 1983. He played at three Greek teams as head goalkeeper and was goalkeeper coach at another. .

Kyriakos Tohouroglou is an Honorary Life Member of Melbourne Club PAOK, The official PAOK Thessaloniki Supporters Club of Australia.

Playing career
Tohouroglou was signed by Greek First Division team Doxa Drama F.C. in 1991. After two and a half years in Drama he moved to Olympiakos for the 1994/95 season. In 1996, he joined 
Paniliakos F.C.

Rejoining Olympiakos in 1997 Tohouroglou played 32 matches in his first season. He played six UEFA Champions League and two UEFA Cup matches for Olympiakos.

In 2000 Tohouroglou moved to PAOK F.C. Playing at PAOK he was part of the Greek Football Cup winning team in 2001 and 2003. After playing for 8 years at PAOK, he proceeded to acquire his coaching diploma.

He did his apprenticeship in Xanthi with the first team of "Skoda Xanthi" as goalkeepers coach and as assistant coach in 2008 where he stayed for two years until 2010.

In 2011 Tohouroglou returned to Australia to be a goalkeeper/concrete tester once again at the team in which he began his football career as a child, Gladesville Ryde Magic F.C, while at the same time coaching in Olympiakos's football academies in Sydney. He has been voted goalkeeper of the year for four years in a row 2012, 2013, 2014, 2015 and player of the year in 2012 and also won the NSW State League 1 Championship in 2012. In 2018, Tohouroglou was voted Goalkeeper of the Year for the 5th time in his career in Australia.

Honours

Club
Olympiakos
 Alpha Ethniki: (3) 1997–98, 1998–99, 1999–2000
 Greek Cup: (1) 1998–99

 PAOK
 Greek Cup: (2) 2000–01, 2002–03

  Gladesville Ryde Magic 
 State League 1 NSW Champions: 2012

Individual
  Gladesville Ryde Magic 
 Goalkeeper of the year: 2012, 2013, 2014, 2015, 2018, 2019
 Player of the year: 2012

References

1972 births
Living people
Australian people of Greek descent
Soccer players from Sydney
Paniliakos F.C. players
Super League Greece players
Doxa Drama F.C. players
Olympiacos F.C. players
PAOK FC players
Association football goalkeepers
Australian soccer players